The Cleveland Show is an American animated series co-created by Seth MacFarlane, Mike Henry and Richard Appel. The series focuses on the life of Cleveland Brown (Mike Henry), his son Cleveland Jr. (Kevin Michael Richardson), his wife Donna (Sanaa Lathan) and her kids Roberta (Reagan Gomez-Preston; Nia Long, 2009) and Rallo (Mike Henry). The series ran on Fox from September 27, 2009, to May 19, 2013.

The series, which was picked up for an initial order of 22 production episodes (1APSxx), was picked up by Fox for a second order of production episodes, consisting of 13 episodes, bringing the total number of ordered episodes to 35. The announcement was made on May 3, 2009, before the series even premiered. It was then picked up for the remaining nine episodes of the second season bringing the total number of episodes ordered to 44. On June 10, 2010, less than three weeks into the first season's summer hiatus, it was announced that Fox was ordering a third season. A fourth season was announced on May 9, 2011.

On April 17, 2013, Fox dismissed increasing rumors that The Cleveland Show had been cancelled, reporting rather that renewal of the series was undetermined as of that time. However, on May 13, 2013, in the New York Daily News, Fox Chairman of Entertainment Kevin Reilly confirmed its cancellation. Following the series cancellation, it was confirmed that Cleveland and the Brown/Tubbs family would be moving back to Quahog to rejoin the Family Guy cast.

Series overview

Episode list

Season 1 (2009–10)

Season 2 (2010–11)

Season 3 (2011–12)

Season 4 (2012–13)

Series finale (2014)

Ratings

Notes

References

External links
 Official The Cleveland Show website

 
Cleveland Show, The
Cleveland Show, The